Transformer-2 protein homolog beta, also known as TRA2B previously known as splicing factor, arginine/serine-rich 10 (transformer 2 homolog, Drosophila) (SFRS10), is a protein that in humans is encoded by the TRA2B gene.

Interactions
TRA2B has been shown to interact with RBMX.

References

Further reading